Adrian Sassoon (born February 1961) is an English art dealer, art collector and writer. He was schooled at Eton College, where he was taught ceramics by Gordon Baldwin; he went on to study further at Christie’s Education. He worked as an assistant curator at the J. Paul Getty Museum in the department of decorative arts. He is the owner and founder of a gallery that shows contemporary art, as well as 18th Century French porcelain.

Early life and education 
Sassoon in interviews has stated that he grew up in a family that had an interest in art, and was therefore interested in it from a young age. He was schooled at Sunningdale School and Eton College, where he was taught ceramics by Gordon Baldwin; he went on to study further at Christie’s Education.

He became fascinated with collecting items and began to do so while still a teenager.

Career 
Sassoon began his career working at the J. Paul Getty Museum at the age of 19 in 1980. He worked as a junior curator specialising in 18th Century French works of art. This specialty has remained with Sassoon throughout his career but has more recently also focused on contemporary art. After working at the Getty Museum in Los Angeles, Sassoon moved to work with a prominent art dealer in London, who was known for selling 17th & 18th Century decorative arts to American museums. In 1991, he authored the catalogue of Vincennes and Sèvres porcelain in The J. Paul Getty Museum.

By 1992, Sassoon had amassed a collection of Vincennes ceramics from the 18th century. Apart from a handful of pieces, he sold the collection in the early 1990s to the Sèvres City of Ceramics Museum when he first went it alone as a prominent dealer in this field. Since selling his first Vincennes collection, he has over the subsequent decades formed another collection of new finds of the same early French porcelain. Twenty pieces of this second collection are on long-term loan to The J. Paul Getty Museum.

A number of pieces in Sassoon's art collection have been displayed in museums around the world. He is also known to be a collector of sculptures by Hiroshi Suzuki, a leading contemporary silversmith and other contemporary works of art. Sassoon curated a selection of contemporary ceramics and silver in ‘Inspired by Chatsworth’ for Sotheby’s New York exhibition in 2019 in association with The Chatsworth Estate. During the same year, it was announced that three works by Dame Magdalene Odundo from Sassoon's collection were on display at The Hepworth Wakefield.

Since the mid-1990s, Sassoon has represented a number of established artists working in ceramics, glass, gold, silver, lacquer and hardstones, and is most widely known as a leading art dealer in this field. Kate Malone, Stephen Cox and Elizabeth Fritsch are among the artists represented by Sassoon. He has expanded his expertise to include not merely contemporary British, but also Australian and Japanese works of art, including those by ceramicists Pippin Drysdale and Tanabe Chikuunsai IV respectively.

In 2007, Sassoon was appointed as a Trustee of The Wallace Collection, holding the position until 2015. From 2013 to 2019, Sassoon served as a Trustee of The Silver Trust, London, which provided a collection of contemporary British silver for the use of the Prime Minister at Number 10 Downing Street.

In 2013, Sassoon authored a monograph for the Metropolitan Museum of Art, New York, on JAR, the leading contemporary jewellery designer Joel A. Rosenthal.

He is currently a Trustee for the Hermitage Foundation UK, which supports The State Hermitage Museum in St. Petersburg, Russia, and a member of the International Council of The Metropolitan Museum.

Personal life 
Sassoon is a member of the Sassoon family, and was born in London, the son of Hugh Meyer Sassoon (first cousin of Siegfried Sassoon) and Marion (née Schiff); he is the great-great-grandson of Sassoon David Sassoon.

Articles & Essays
 Vincennes and Sèvres Porcelain from a European Private Collection, International Ceramics Fair & Seminar, 2001

Books
 Vincennes and Sèvres Porcelain: Catalogue of the Collections. J. Paul Getty Museum, 1991.
 Decorative Arts: A Handbook of the Collections of the J. Paul Getty Museum. Getty Trust Publications: J. Paul Getty Museum.
Jewels by JAR. Metropolitan Museum of Art, New York. 2013
 Kate Malone : Inspired by Waddesdon. Foreword by Adrian Sassoon, 2016.
Colin Reid: Glass Sculpture. Foreword by Adrian Sassoon. Eds: By Clare Beck and Kathleen Slater

References

1961 births
Living people
English art dealers
English writers
English male writers
Adrian
British writers of Indian descent
British people of Indian-Jewish descent
Baghdadi Jews
People educated at Eton College
People educated at Sunningdale School